The 1969–70 Eredivisie season was the tenth season of the Eredivisie, the top level of ice hockey in the Netherlands. Four teams participated in the league, and S.IJ. Den Bosch won the championship.

Regular season

External links
Nederlandse IJshockey Bond

Neth
Eredivisie (ice hockey) seasons